Daniel-Jérémie Décarie (March 20, 1836 – October 30, 1904) was a Canadian politician.

Born in Montreal, the son of Jérémie Descary and Apolline Gougeon, Décarie was elected to the Legislative Assembly of Quebec for the electoral district of Hochelaga in 1897. A Liberal, he was re-elected without opposition in 1900. He died in office in 1904 and he was entombed at the Notre Dame des Neiges Cemetery in Montreal. His son, Jérémie-Louis Décarie was also a Quebec MLA.

References

 

1836 births
1904 deaths
Quebec Liberal Party MNAs
Burials at Notre Dame des Neiges Cemetery